The Chaush or Chaus are Muslim community of Hadhrami Arab descent found in the Deccan region of India.
Chaush is an indianized version of the Arabic word JAYSH, which means Army. Most of the Arabs were drafted in Hyderabad army whether it was the Nizam's Army or the Nazm E Jamiat (irregular army). So that's how Chaush came in to existence 

The Chaush or Chaus were brought from Yemen to work in the former Hyderabad State as military men and body guards for the Nizams. It is said that especially when it came to safe guarding his family, the 7th Nizam had absolute trust on these Arab bodyguards.
 They are most concentrated in the neighbourhood of Barkas in Hyderabad city and Aurangabad Chaush are spread across erstwhile Hyderabad State(Deccan) notably in Adilabad, Nizamabad,Karimnagar,Asifabad, Kagaznagar,Parbhani and Balharsha. Many Chaush later settled in other parts of India, and around the world as part of the Hyderabadi diaspora, especially in Pakistan, and Arab states of the Persian Gulf.

The founders of both the Qu'aiti and Kathiri states in Hadhramawt had previously served as jemadars in Hyderabad.

Most Arabs (Chaush) still take pride in their culture wearing traditional lungi and headgear called ghutra. Locals identify them by their tribes.

Among the best known cultural contributions of the Chaush to India are Marfa music and dance, and Hyderabadi haleem, both which are culturally important to the Hyderabadi Muslim people, and seen at almost all wedding ceremonies.

Culture

Cuisine
The Hyderabadi Haleem and Mandi have been introduced in Hyderabad by the Chaush people.

Notable people
 Subhani ba Yunus, Pakistani actor
 General El Edroos
 Sulaiman Areeb, Urdu poet
 Awaz Sayeed, Urdu writer
 Esa Misri, Bodybuilder
 Ahmed balala, Politician
 Sayeed Amodi

See also
 Arabs of Gujarat
 Hadhrami people
 Siddi
 Hyderabadi Pahalwan
 Chiaus

References

Further reading
 Omar Khalidi, The Arabs of Hadramawt in Hyderabad in Mediaeval Deccan History, eds Kulkarni, Naeem and de Souza, Popular Prakashan, Bombay, 1996
 Leif Manger, Hadramis in Hyderabad: From Winners to Losers, Asian Journal of Social Science, Volume 35, Numbers 4–5, 2007, pp. 405–433(29)
 Engseng Ho, The Graves of Tarim: Genealogy and Mobility across the Indian Ocean, University of California Press, 2006
 Ababu Minda Yimene, An African Indian community in Hyderabad, Cuvillier Verlag, 2004, pg 201
 Hadhrami Traders, Scholars, and Statesmen in the Indian Ocean:1750s-1960s By-Ulrike Freitag and W. G. Clarence-Smith

Arab diaspora in India
Arab groups
Ethnic groups in India
Hadhrami people
 
Muhajir communities
Muslim communities of Karnataka
Social groups of Karnataka
Social groups of Maharashtra
Social groups of Telangana
Hyderabad State Forces